The 1954 NCAA Wrestling Championships were the 24th NCAA Wrestling Championships to be held. The University of Oklahoma in Norman, Oklahoma hosted the tournament at McCasland Field House.

Oklahoma A&M took home the team championship with 32 points and having three individual champions.

Tommy Evans of Oklahoma was named the Most Outstanding Wrestler.

Team results

Individual finals

References 

NCAA Division I Wrestling Championship
Wrestling competitions in the United States
NCAA Wrestling Championships
NCAA Wrestling Championships
NCAA Wrestling Championships